Przyszów  is a village in the administrative district of Gmina Bojanów, within Stalowa Wola County, Subcarpathian Voivodeship, in south-eastern Poland.

Strażak Przyszów
Klub Sportowy Strażak Przyszów was a Polish football club that was established in 2001. Their greatest success was playing in the regional league in 2009-2012. The club was dissolved after the B-class 2018–19 season.

References

Villages in Stalowa Wola County